Luis García Montero (born 4 December 1958) is a Spanish poet and literary critic, as well as a professor of Spanish Literature at the University of Granada.

Biography 

Descended from a granadino family that was very active in the community, Luis García Montero was born in Granada in 1958 as the son of Luis García López and Elisa Montero Peña, and studied at the Colegio Dulce Nombre de María- PP.Escolapios in Granada. As a teenager, he was a fan of equestrian sports and had the opportunity to meet Blas de Otero.

He studied Philosophy and literature at the University of Granada, where he was a student of Juan Carlos Rodríguez Gómez, a social literature theorist. He received his Masters in 1980 and later became a doctorate in 1985 with a thesis about Rafael Alberti, La norma y los estilos en la poesía de Rafael Alberti or The norm and styles of Rafael Alberti's poetry. He maintained a great friendship with Alberti, a poet of the Generation of '27, and prepared a compilation of all his works of poetry.

He began to work as an associate professor at the University of Granada in 1981. He received the Premio Adonáis de Poesía in 1982 for El jardín extranjero. He created a memoir of his studies in 1984 about El teatro medieval. Polémica de una inexistencia or Medieval theatre. Controversy of an inexistence.

He became linked to the poetic group La Otra Setimentalidad (The Other Sentimentality), a wave in which contemporary Spanish poetry took the name of its first joint book, published in 1983, in which poets Javier Egea and Álvaro Salvador also participated. The poetics of the group remained reflected above all in this short book and in lesser part in his manifesto Manifiesto albertista (1982) by Luis García Montero and Javier Egea. Their personal trajectory began widening in what would later become known as poesía de la experiencia or poetry of the experience and is characterized by the general tendency to dillude the most personal I in the collective experience, furthering itself from the stylistic and thematic individuality of previous Novísimos authors; Garía and his group, however, tried to relate themselves with the previous poetic tradition taking in the postulates Luis Cernuda and Jaime Gil de Biedma and tried to unite the aesthetics of Antonio Machado with the thinking of the Generation of the '50s, as well as with Surrealism and the impactful images of Spanish Baroque poets or those of Juan Ramón Jiménez.

Garía Montero's most distinguishable characteristic is the history-biographical narrativism of his poems; a structure almost theatrical or novelistic with a character or protagonist that tells or lives his story through recollection, memory or desire.

His poetry is characterized by a colloquial language and by his reflections regarding every day events or situations.

He's edited Rimas (Rhymes) by Gustavo Adolfo Bécquer, among other theoretical works. He has also cultivated the art of essay writing and is an opinion columnist. Between the award-winning poetics that he's received, the most impressive have been the Premio Federico García Lorca, the Premio Loewe, the Premio Adonáis of poetry and the National Poetry Award – which he was presented with in 1995 – and the Premio Nacional de la Crítica in 2003. In 2010 he was awarded in Mexico the Premio Poetas del Mundo Latino for his literary career.

Since 1994 he has shared his life with writer Almudena Grandes and has three children.

Since he was very young he has been an active member in the PCE and, since its foundation, in the United Left. In the 2004 European Parliament election he was a United Left candidate. Prior to the 2011 Spanish general election he declared his support for United Left. In October 2012 it was announced that he would take on a key role in Izquierda Abierta, a new party led by Gaspar Llamazares and Montse Muñoz that was part of the United Left coalition.

On 22 October 2008 Luis García Montero was condemned for a libel case in writing an article calling professor José Antonio Fortes "disturbed." While in his classes at the University of Granada and in writing, Fortes called Federico García Lorca a fascist and the exiled writer Francisco Ayala a Nazi. García Montero asked for unpaid leave as a lecturer of said university.

García Montero ran first in the United Left Community of Madrid–The Greens list for the 2015 regional election in the Community of Madrid, failing to obtain a seat.

Awards 
Premio Adonáis de Poesía, for El jardín extranjero. (1982)
Premio Loewe, for Habitaciones separadas. (1994)
National Poetry Award, for Habitaciones separadas. (1995)
Premio Nacional de la Crítica, for La intimidad de la serpiente. (2003)
Premio Poetas del Mundo Latino, for his career. (2010)

Controversies 

On 22 October 2008 Luis García Montero was condemned for an injuries case against José Antonio Fortes, professor at the University of Granada. The poet in an article published in El País called the professor Fortes disturbing for claiming that Lorcan poetry had been served as an ideological breeding ground for fascist poetry. In other writings, Fortes had attacked Francisco Ayala, Antonio Muñoz Molina, Joaquín Sabina, Gustavo Adolfo Bécquer and Rafael Alberti, as fascist writers or Capitalism sellers. The judge Miguel Ángel Torres - famous for the known Malaya urbanistic corruption case-, sentenced Luis García Montero to pay a fine of €1,800 as well as another €3,000 to the professor Fortes for serious publicity injuries. The poet referred to Fortes as an "indecent fool", and "disturbed", and in a meeting with other members of the Department he called him a "son of a bitch" and an "asshole". Although he thanked the many institutional and personal solidarity displays, García Montero announced a short time afterward a request for a leave of absence from the lecturer post that he had at the University of Granada, in which he entered as a professor in 1981. He renounces that he left a year later because he found the university Department environment "unbreathable".

One other controversy, this one related to the Premio de Poesía "Ciudad de Burgos" (2012), appeared published in at least three Spanish newspapers. Thus the Diario de Burgos titled it: "Una polémica decisión del jurado cuestiona la limpieza del Premio "Ciudad de Burgos"  while El Correo de Burgos said "La polémica se sirve en verso" ("Controversy served in verse"). El Ideal de Granada also picked up the news with the headline: "Polémica en el premio 'Ciudad de Burgos', otorgado al poeta granadino Daniel Rodríguez Moya" ("'Ciudad de Burgos' prize controversy awarded to granadino poet Daniel Rodríquez Moya").

Poetic works 
Y ahora ya eres dueño del Puente de Brooklyn, Granada, University (Zumaya collection), 1980, Premio Federico García Lorca.
Tristia, in collaboration with Álvaro Salvador, Melilla, Rusadir, 1982. 
El jardín extranjero, Madrid, Rialp, (Premio Adonáis), 1983 (... Poemas de Tristia, Madrid, Hiperión, 1989). 
Rimado de ciudad, Granada town hall, 1983. 
Égloga de dos rascacielos, Granada, Romper el Cerco, 1984 (2ª ed. Madrid, Hiperión, 1989).
En pie de paz, Granada, Editions of the Committee of Solitarity with Central America, 1985. 
Seis poemas del mar (autógrafos), [Riotinto?], Pliegos de Mineral, 1985.
Diario cómplice, Madrid, Hiperión, 1987.
Anuncios por palabras, Málaga, Plaza de la Marina, 1988. 
Secreto de amistad, Málaga, I. B. Sierra Bermeja, 1990.
Las flores del frío, Madrid, Hiperión, 1990.
En otra edad, Málaga, Librería Anticuaria El Guadalhorce, 1992.
Fotografías veladas de la lluvia, Valladolid, El Gato Gris, 1993.
Habitaciones separadas, Madrid, Visor, 1994: (Premio Loewe y Premio Nacional de Literatura)
Además, Madrid, Hiperión, 1994.
Quedarse sin ciudad, Palma de Mallorca, Monograma, 1994.
Casi cien poemas (1980-1996): antología, prologue by José Carlos Mainer, Madrid, Hiperión, 1997. 
Completamente viernes, Barcelona, Tusquets, 1998.
Antología personal, Madrid, Visor, 2001.
Poemas, Santander, Ultramar, 2001.
Antología poética, Madrid, Castalia, 2002.
Poesía urbana (antología 1980-2002); study and selections by Laura Scarano, Sevilla, Renacimiento, 2002.
La intimidad de la serpiente, Barcelona, Tusquets, 2003, Premio Nacional de la Crítica 2003.
Poesía (1980-2005); ocho libros ordenados y reunidos, Barcelona, Tusquets, 2006.
Infancia; Málaga, Castillian collection from English, 2006.
Vista cansada, Madrid, Visor, 2008
Canciones, edition by Juan Carlos Abril, Valencia, Pre-Textos, 2009
Un invierno propio, Madrid, Visor, 2011
Ropa de calle, Madrid, Cátedra, 2011

Essays and article collections (selection) 

La otra sentimentalidad, together with Javier Egea and Álvaro Salvador, Granada, Don Quijote, 1983. 
La norma y los estilos en la poesía de Rafael Alberti (1920-1939), Granada, Servicio de Publicaciones, Universidad de Granada, 1986.
Poesía, cuartel de invierno, Madrid Hiperión, 1988 (2nd ed. Barcelona, Seix-Barral, 2002).
Confesiones poéticas, Granada, Diputación Provincial, 1993. 
La palabra de Ícaro (literary studies about García Lorca and Alberti), Granada, Servicio de Publicaciones de la Universidad de Granada, 1996.
Lecciones de poesía para niños inquietos (Illustrations by Juan Vida), Granada, Editorial Comares, 1999: The book is aimed directly toward young readers and intends to show them what poetry consists of.
El sexto día : historia íntima de la poesía española, Madrid, Debate, 2000.
Gigante y extraño : las "Rimas" de Gustavo Adolfo Bécquer, Barcelona, Tusquets, 2001.
Los dueños del vacío. La conciencia poética, entre la identidad y los vínculos, Barcelona, Tusquets, 2006.
Inquietudes bárbaras, Barcelona, Anagrama, 2008.

Novela 
 In 2009 he published his first novel, Mañana no será lo que Dios quiera, about the life of the poet Ángel González, who died in 2008. For this book he received the Premio del Gremio de Libreros al Mejor libro of 2009.
 In 2012 he published his second novel No me cuentes tu vida (Don't tell me your life), in which he reflects throughout three generations about the recent history of Spain.

Other books 

He also published a book of narrative mistakes about his infancy (Luna del sur, Sevilla: Renacimiento, 1992), a novel together with Felipe Benítez Reyes (Impares, fila 13, Barcelona: Planeta, 1996) and the children's book La mudanza de Adán (Adam's moving) (Madrid: Anaya, 2002). His short story Dedicatoria has been included in the book  Las musas de Rorschach  (Logroño: Editorial Buscarini, 2008).
At a conference, his work was dedicated at the Autonomous University of Madrid in 2008 and with more financial contributions than any other writer or critic, El romántico ilustrado. Images by Luis García Montero, Juan Carlos Abril and Xelo Candel Vila Edition, Sevilla, Renacimiento, 2009.

References

External links 
English
Luis García Montero, some poems translated in English in WordsWithoutBorders.org

Spanish
Official site of poet Luis García Montero
Space dedicated to Luis García Montero in the Cervantes Virtual Library
Poetic Anthonlogy in A media voz
Poetic Anthology in SiFuesePoeta
Biography in El poder de la palabra
Poems by Luis García Montero in regards to poetic creation
Overview of the work "Los dueños del vacío" by Luis García Montero

Interviews and documentaries about Luis García Montero 
 Interview in Espacio de Libros, October 2012.
Radio interview in the Programa Señales de Humo
Interview in Diario El Correo: "He creído en ideas que hoy veo un poco encogidas"
Interview in Diario La Rioja: "No me gustaría dejar de escribir a los 50"

Luis García Montero, documentary and interview of the thesis program

1958 births
University of Granada alumni
20th-century Spanish poets
People from Granada
Living people
Spanish male poets
21st-century Spanish poets
20th-century Spanish male writers
21st-century Spanish male writers